The 2017–18 Martinique Championnat National is the 98th season of the Championnat National, top division of football in Martinique. The season began on 1 September 2017 and ended on 2 June 2018.

Standings
Note: 4 points for a win, 2 points for a draw, 1 point for a defeat.

Final table.

References

External links 
Martinique Championnat National (French)

2017-18
Martinique
football
football